A shillelagh (or  , "thonged willow") is a wooden walking stick and club or cudgel, typically made from a stout knotty blackthorn stick with a large knob at the top.  It is associated with Ireland and Irish folklore.

Other spelling variants include shillelah, shillalah, and shillaly.

Etymology 

As an alternate etymology, Anna Maria Hall and Patrick Weston Joyce have written that the name may have derived from the wood being sourced from forest land in the village or barony of Shillelagh, County Wicklow.

Construction 
Shillelaghs are traditionally made from blackthorn (sloe) wood (Prunus spinosa) or oak. With the scarcity of oak in Ireland the term came increasingly to denote a blackthorn stick, and indeed blackthorn stick is sometimes glossed as equivalent to shillelagh.

Wood from the root was prized since this would be used for the knob, and was less prone to crack or break during use.

Curing and polishing 
Most commonly, the chosen wood would be placed up a chimney to cure for a duration of several months to several years; the accumulated layer of soot gave the shillelagh its typical black shiny appearance.

The less frequent methods were to bury the shank in a dung pile, or in slaked lime. The stick may require protection from its dung bath by being wrapped in well-greased oiled brown paper (steeped in hog's lard or oil).

Both of the previous methods would be finished with oils or sealants, etc. A further coat of special soot finish may be applied, or a mixture of black lead and grease rubbed on with woolen cloth to a polishing finish. Some examples may just be given a coat of black paint.

Rarer still was brining, where the shank was placed into a basin of saltwater. The saltwater, being a hypertonic solution, would pull moisture from the shank with little warping. One isolated case of this brining method being used, by Charlotte Brontë's uncle named Hugh, has been documented. Hugh Brontë is said to have rubbed train oil (whale oil) on the stick using chamois leather, and applied magpie blood to give it a darker appearance.

Dimensions 

Fittings 
Shillelaghs may be hollowed at the heavy "hitting" end and filled with molten lead to increase the weight beyond the typical two pounds; this sort of shillelagh is known as a 'loaded stick'.

The loaded types needed to have its knob fitted with iron ferrules to maintain structural integrity, and the sticks also have iron ferrules fitted onto their narrow end. Shillelaghs may also have a heavy knob for a handle which can be used for striking. Shillelaghs may also have a strap attached, similar to commercially made walking sticks, to place around the holder's wrist.

History 

The shillelagh was originally used for settling disputes in a gentlemanly manner — like a duel with pistols or swords. Modern practitioners of bataireacht study the use of the shillelagh for self-defence and as a martial art. Of the practice, researcher J. W. Hurley writes:

Methods of shillelagh fighting have evolved over a period of thousands of years, from the spear, staff, axe and sword fighting of the Irish. There is some evidence which suggests that the use of Irish stick weapons may have evolved in a progression from a reliance on long spears and wattles, to shorter spears and wattles, to the shillelagh, alpeen, blackthorn (walking-stick) and short cudgel. By the 19th century Irish shillelagh-fighting had evolved into a practice which involved the use of three basic types of weapons, sticks which were long, medium or short in length.

Folklore and balladry 
Shillelaghs are sometimes referred to in a similar context in folk songs. In the ballad "Finnegan's Wake" occurs the phrase "Shillelagh law did all engage", signifying that a brawl has broken out; "shillelagh law" itself has been explained as meaning the accepted rule governing the usage of the weapon.

The novelty song "It's the Same Old Shillelagh" was written by Pat White and recorded by him in 1927. Its subject is a young Irish-American who inherits his father's shillelagh.

The anti-recruiting folk song "Arthur McBride", where the recruiters are struck with a shillelagh, and in the 19th-century song "Rocky Road to Dublin", in which references are made to fashioning a shillelagh ("I cut a stout blackthorn"), and using it ("shillalah") to hold a tied bag over one's shoulder, and using it as a striking weapon.

Charles Dibdin the younger wrote a song entitled "The Twig of Shelaly", later reprinted as "The Twig of Shillelah".

Bing Crosby recorded a song entitled "Two Shillelagh O'Sullivan" in the 1950s.

Modern usage 

The shillelagh came to be regarded as a stereotypical symbol of Irishness in popular culture, particularly in an Irish-American context.

Members of a number of Irish regiments in the British Armed Forces have traditionally carried Blackthorn sticks, including officers of the Irish Guards, the Royal Irish Regiment and the Royal Dragoon Guards. Officers and senior non-commissioned officers of the 1st Battalion/69th Infantry Regiment (The Fighting 69th) of the New York Army National Guard's 27th Infantry Brigade also carry shillelaghs whilst on parade.

In sports, the Boston Celtics logo has a leprechaun leaning on his shillelagh, and it also features with the leprechaun on some logos of Brothers Rugby league teams in Australia. In San Diego, Padres broadcaster Mark Grant popularised the shillelagh as a rallying call, by using terms like "Shillelagh Power" to describe late-game heroics by the Padres. The success of the phrase led the San Diego Padres store to carry inflatable shillelaghs. Similarly, in the college games of American football, a Jeweled Shillelagh is the trophy given to the winner of the rivalry game between the USC Trojans and Notre Dame Fighting Irish.

A number of items take their name from the shillelagh, including the MGM-51 Shillelagh anti-tank missile, and several aircraft of the 357th Fighter Group which were named for the club, and had similar representative nose art. In the tabletop game Dungeons & Dragons, 'shillelagh' is a low-level spell used by casters to make simple clubs into powerful bludgeoning weapons.

See also 
 Knobkerrie, a similar club associated with Southern Africa and World War I British troops
 Rungu (weapon), a similar club common in East Africa
 Sgian-dubh, a knife worn as part of Scottish Highland attire
 Veiled Prophet Parade and Ball#Notable VP Parade incidents and activities

Footnotes

References

Notes

Sources

Further reading
 

Clubs (weapon)
Primitive weapons
Ritual weapons
Irish folklore
Fashion accessories